Perhaps you are looking for one of the following:

 Bhutan, a country in the Himalayas, Asia
 Butane, a chemical compound
 Marc Butan, American film director
 Butuan, a city in the Philippines
 Button (disambiguation)